Dennis Jonsson (born 16 February 1983 in Gothenburg) is a Swedish football defender currently playing for Örgryte IS.

After playing for a local club, he joined IFK Göteborg in 1996. During his years for IFK Göteborg, he became a very popular player amongst the fans due to his love for the club. He also featured for the Swedish U-21 national team. His finest moment for the club came on his debut, when he scored against rivals AIK. When his contract expired after the 2006 season, he signed for the Norwegian club Raufoss IL. In 2008, he returned to Gothenburg but not to IFK Göteborg, instead he signed a two-year contract with IFK main rivals ÖIS.

Career table

Notes

External links 
 

1983 births
Living people
Swedish footballers
IFK Göteborg players
Örgryte IS players
Hisingsbacka FC players
Raufoss IL players
Allsvenskan players
Swedish expatriate footballers
Expatriate footballers in Norway
Swedish expatriate sportspeople in Norway
Association football defenders
Footballers from Gothenburg